DDN may refer to:

Arts, media and entertainment
 Daydream Nation, a music album by Sonic Youth
 Dayton Daily News, a daily newspaper in Dayton, Ohio, US
 Digital Delivery Network, a service of the Community Radio Network in Australia
 Digital Distribution Netherlands, a Dutch digital music distributor
 Double Down News, an alternative media outlet in the UK
 Dustin's Daily News, a comedic current affairs TV show

Computing
 DataDirect Networks, a data storage company
 Defense Data Network, a separate instantiation of the ARPANET used by the U.S. Department of Defense from 1983 to 1995
 Dot-decimal notation, a human readable way to write IPv4 internet addresses

Other uses
 Dehradun railway station (station code), India
 Digital Divide Network, an online community of activists